Tan Weihong (born May 12, 1960) is a Chinese chemist. He is the University of Florida Distinguished Professor,  V. T. and Louise Jackson Professor of Chemistry at the University of Florida, and also the Professor of Chemistry and Chemical Engineering, Professor of Biology, and Director of the State Key Laboratory of Chemo/Biosensing and Chemometrics at Hunan University in China. He was elected an academician of the Chinese Academy of Sciences in 2015 and The World Academy of Sciences in 2016.

Early life and education
Tan was born on May 12, 1960 in Yiyang, Hunan, China. He received his B.S. degree in Chemistry from Hunan Normal University in 1982, his M.S. degree in Physical Chemistry from the Institute of Coal Chemistry, Chinese Academy of Sciences in 1985, and his Ph.D. in Physical Chemistry from University of Michigan, Ann Arbor in 1992 under the supervision of Dr. Raoul Kopelman. In 1994–1995, he conducted his postdoctoral research at Ames Laboratory where he worked with Dr. Edward S. Yeung.

Research
The main focus of Tan's group is in the field of DNA aptamers, molecular recognition and nano biosensors. The Tan group has pioneered the Whole-Cell Systematic Evolution of Ligands by Exponential Enrichment method (SELEX). This fundamental tool is used to select aptamer molecules against specific cell-lines for a wide range of applications. A variety of high sensitive aptamer-based molecular designs have been developed by Tan group and contributed to theranostic and bioanalysis studies.

Tan has served on many national and international research program committees, and also several Editorial and Advisory Boards, including ACS Nano and Analytical Chemistry.

Tan has helped develop a test for COVID-19 that produced results in as little as 40 minutes.

Awards and honors 
Elected to The World Academy of Sciences, 2016
Elected to the Chinese Academy of Sciences, 2015
HHMI Distinguished Mentor Award, 2014
University Postdoc Mentor Award, 2014
ACS Florida Achievement Award, American Chemical Society Florida Section, 2012
Iddles Lecturer for 2012, University of New Hampshire, 2012
University of Florida Distinguished Professor, University of Florida, 2012 to now
Howard Hughes Medical Institute Distinguished Mentor Award, University of Florida, 2010
Senior Fellow Award, Japan Society of Science and Technology, Tokyo University, 2010
National Distinguished experts, China, 2009 to now
V. T. and Louis Jackson Professor, Endowed Chair Professorship at University of Florida, 2008 to now
Vice Chair and Chair-elect, Chair, Gordon Research Conference on Bioanalytical Sensors, 2007-2010
NIH Enabling bioanalytical and biophysical technologies study section member, 2007-2011
President-elect, President, Sigma Xi Society, University of Florida Chapter, 2004-2005-2006
Honorary Professor, Changchun Int. of Applied Chem., Chinese Academy of Sciences, August, 2006
Elected Fellow, The American Association for the Advancement of Science (AAAS), 2005
Research Excellence Scholar, Chinese Academy of Sciences, Beijing, China, August, 2005
UF Research Foundation Professorship Award, University of Florida, 2004-2007
Pittsburgh Conference Achievement Award, Pittsburgh Conference on Analytical Chemistry and Applied Spectroscopy, March, 2004
Science and Technology Award, Japan Society of Science and Technology, 2003
Packard Science and Technology Award, Packard Foundation, 2002
Cheungkong Research Scholar, Li Ka Shing Foundation, Hong Kong, 2001
Junior Faculty Research Award, Sigma Xi, The Scientific Research Society, 2000
Science and Technology Fellowship Award, Japan Society of Science and Technology, 2000
Distinguished Overseas Scholar Award, National Science Foundation of China, 2000
Biomedical Engineering Award, Whitaker Foundation, 1998
Cottrell Scholar, Research Corporation, 1999
Young Investigator Award, Office of Naval Research, Department of Defense, 1998
NSF Faculty Career Award, National Science Foundation, 1998
Beckman Young Investigator Award, Arnold Beckman Foundation, 1997

References

1960 births
Living people
Chemists from Hunan
Chinese expatriates in the United States
Educators from Hunan
Hunan Normal University alumni
Academic staff of Hunan University
Members of the Chinese Academy of Sciences
People from Yiyang
TWAS fellows
University of Florida faculty
University of Michigan alumni